Rettino is an Italian surname. Notable people with the surname include:

Debby Kerner & Ernie Rettino, an American musical duo

Italian-language surnames